Adolphe Libaire (May 2, 1840 – September 5, 1920) was a captain in the Union Army and a Medal of Honor recipient for his actions in the American Civil War.

Libaire was commissioned into the 9th New York Infantry in July 1861 and mustered out with his regiment in May 1863.

Medal of Honor citation
Rank and organization: Captain, Company E, 9th New York Infantry. Place and date: At Antietam, Md., September 17, 1862. Entered service at: New York, N.Y. Birth:------. Date of issue: April 2, 1898.

Citation:

In the advance on the enemy and after his color bearer and the entire color guard of 8 men had been shot down, this officer seized the regimental flag and with conspicuous gallantry carried it to the extreme front, urging the line forward.

See also

List of American Civil War Medal of Honor recipients: G–L

References

 

1840 births
1920 deaths
People from Meurthe-et-Moselle
French emigrants to the United States
People from New York (state)
People of New York (state) in the American Civil War
Burials at Green-Wood Cemetery
Union Army officers
United States Army Medal of Honor recipients
French-born Medal of Honor recipients
American Civil War recipients of the Medal of Honor